Andreas Hansen may refer to:
 Andreas Nicolai Hansen (1798–1893), Danish businessman and landowner
 Andreas Falkvard Hansen (born 1966), Faroese football defender
 Andreas Granskov Hansen (born 1989), Danish footballer
 Andreas Hansen (footballer) (born 1995), Danish football goalkeeper
 Andreas Hansen (cyclist) (born 1869), Danish cyclist